Donna Lichtenegger (born July 26, 1956) is an American politician. She was a member of the Missouri House of Representatives from 2011 to 2019. She is a member of the Republican party.

References

1956 births
21st-century American politicians
21st-century American women politicians
Living people
Republican Party members of the Missouri House of Representatives
Politicians from St. Louis
Women state legislators in Missouri